In mathematics, a generating function is a way of encoding an infinite sequence of numbers by treating them as the coefficients of a formal power series. This series is called the generating function of the sequence. Unlike an ordinary series, the formal power series is not required to converge: in fact, the generating function is not actually regarded as a function, and the "variable" remains an indeterminate. Generating functions were first introduced by Abraham de Moivre in 1730, in order to solve the general linear recurrence problem. One can generalize to formal power series in more than one indeterminate, to encode information about infinite multi-dimensional arrays of numbers.

There are various types of generating functions, including ordinary generating functions, exponential generating functions, Lambert series, Bell series, and Dirichlet series; definitions and examples are given below. Every sequence in principle has a generating function of each type (except that Lambert and Dirichlet series require indices to start at 1 rather than 0), but the ease with which they can be handled may differ considerably. The particular generating function, if any, that is most useful in a given context will depend upon the nature of the sequence and the details of the problem being addressed.

Generating functions are often expressed in closed form (rather than as a series), by some expression involving operations defined for formal series. These expressions in terms of the indeterminate  may involve arithmetic operations, differentiation with respect to  and composition with (i.e., substitution into) other generating functions; since these operations are also defined for functions, the result looks like a function of . However such interpretation is not required to be possible, because formal series are not required to give a convergent series when a nonzero numeric value is substituted for . Also, not all expressions that are meaningful as functions of  are meaningful as expressions designating formal series; for example, negative and fractional powers of  are examples of functions that do not have a corresponding formal power series.

Generating functions are not functions in the formal sense of a mapping from a domain to a codomain. Generating functions are sometimes called generating series, in that a series of terms can be said to be the generator of its sequence of term coefficients.

Definitions

Ordinary generating function (OGF)

The ordinary generating function of a sequence  is

When the term generating function is used without qualification, it is usually taken to mean an ordinary generating function.

If  is the probability mass function of a discrete random variable, then its ordinary generating function is called a probability-generating function.

The ordinary generating function can be generalized to arrays with multiple indices.

Exponential generating function (EGF)

The exponential generating function of a sequence  is

Exponential generating functions are generally more convenient than ordinary generating functions for combinatorial enumeration problems that involve labelled objects. 

Another benefit of exponential generating functions is that they are useful in transferring linear recurrence relations to the realm of differential equations. For example, take the Fibonacci sequence  that satisfies the linear recurrence relation . The corresponding exponential generating function has the form

and its derivatives can readily be shown to satisfy the differential equation  as a direct analogue with the recurrence relation above.

Poisson generating function
The Poisson generating function of a sequence  is

Lambert series

The Lambert series of a sequence  is

The Lambert series coefficients in the power series expansions

for integers  are related by the divisor sum

The main article provides several more classical, or at least well-known examples related to special arithmetic functions in number theory.

In a Lambert series the index  starts at 1, not at 0, as the first term would otherwise be undefined.

Bell series

The Bell series of a sequence  is an expression in terms of both an indeterminate  and a prime  and is given by

Dirichlet series generating functions (DGFs)

Formal Dirichlet series are often classified as generating functions, although they are not strictly formal power series. The Dirichlet series generating function of a sequence  is

The Dirichlet series generating function is especially useful when  is a multiplicative function, in which case it has an Euler product expression in terms of the function's Bell series

If  is a Dirichlet character then its Dirichlet series generating function is called a Dirichlet -series. We also have a relation between the pair of coefficients in the Lambert series expansions above and their DGFs. Namely, we can prove that

if and only if

where  is the Riemann zeta function.

Polynomial sequence generating functions

The idea of generating functions can be extended to sequences of other objects. Thus, for example, polynomial sequences of binomial type are generated by

Sheffer sequences are generated in a similar way. See the main article generalized Appell polynomials for more information.

Ordinary generating functions

Examples of generating functions for simple sequences 

Polynomials are a special case of ordinary generating functions, corresponding to finite sequences, or equivalently sequences that vanish after a certain point. These are important in that many finite sequences can usefully be interpreted as generating functions, such as the Poincaré polynomial and others.

A fundamental generating function is that of the constant sequence , whose ordinary generating function is the geometric series

The left-hand side is the Maclaurin series expansion of the right-hand side. Moreover, there can be no other power series with this property.

Expressions for the ordinary generating function of other sequences are easily derived from this one. For instance, the substitution  gives the generating function for the geometric sequence  for any constant :

(The equality also follows directly from the fact that the left-hand side is the Maclaurin series expansion of the right-hand side.) In particular,

and the third power has as coefficients the triangular numbers  whose term  is the binomial coefficient , so that

More generally, for any non-negative integer  and non-zero real value , it is true that

Since

one can find the ordinary generating function for the sequence  of square numbers by linear combination of binomial-coefficient generating sequences:

We may also expand alternately to generate this same sequence of squares as a sum of derivatives of the geometric series in the following form:

By induction, we can similarly show for positive integers  that

where  denote the Stirling numbers of the second kind and where the generating function

so that we can form the analogous generating functions over the integral th powers generalizing the result in the square case above. In particular, since we can write

we can apply a well-known finite sum identity involving the Stirling numbers to obtain that

Rational functions 

The ordinary generating function of a sequence can be expressed as a rational function (the ratio of two finite-degree polynomials) if and only if the sequence is a linear recursive sequence with constant coefficients; this generalizes the examples above. Conversely, every sequence generated by a fraction of polynomials satisfies a linear recurrence with constant coefficients; these coefficients are identical to the coefficients of the fraction denominator polynomial (so they can be directly read off). This observation shows it is easy to solve for generating functions of sequences defined by a linear finite difference equation with constant coefficients, and then hence, for explicit closed-form formulas for the coefficients of these generating functions. The prototypical example here is to derive Binet's formula for the Fibonacci numbers via generating function techniques.

We also notice that the class of rational generating functions precisely corresponds to the generating functions that enumerate quasi-polynomial sequences of the form 

In general, Hadamard products of rational functions produce rational generating functions. Similarly, if

is a bivariate rational generating function, then its corresponding diagonal generating function,

is algebraic. For example, if we let

then this generating function's diagonal coefficient generating function is given by the well-known OGF formula

This result is computed in many ways, including Cauchy's integral formula or contour integration, taking complex residues, or by direct manipulations of formal power series in two variables.

Operations on generating functions

Multiplication yields convolution 

Multiplication of ordinary generating functions yields a discrete convolution (the Cauchy product) of the sequences. For example, the sequence of cumulative sums (compare to the slightly more general Euler–Maclaurin formula)

of a sequence with ordinary generating function  has the generating function

because  is the ordinary generating function for the sequence . See also the section on convolutions in the applications section of this article below for further examples of problem solving with convolutions of generating functions and interpretations.

Shifting sequence indices 

Differentiation and integration of generating functions 

We have the following respective power series expansions for the first derivative of a generating function and its integral:

If instead doing  differentiations in sequence, the effect is to multiply by the th falling factorial:

A negative-order reversal of this sequence powers formula corresponding to the operation of repeated integration is defined by the zeta series transformation and its generalizations defined as a derivative-based transformation of generating functions, or alternately termwise by and performing an integral transformation on the sequence generating function. Related operations of performing fractional integration on a sequence generating function are discussed here.

Enumerating arithmetic progressions of sequences 
For , this is simply the familiar decomposition of a function into even and odd parts (i.e., even and odd powers):

More generally, suppose that  and that  denotes the th primitive root of unity. Then, as an application of the discrete Fourier transform, we have the formula

For integers , another useful formula providing somewhat reversed floored arithmetic progressions — effectively repeating each coefficient  times — are generated by the identity

-recursive sequences and holonomic generating functions

Definitions

A formal power series (or function)  is said to be holonomic if it satisfies a linear differential equation of the form

where the coefficients  are in the field of rational functions, . Equivalently,  is holonomic if the vector space over  spanned by the set of all of its derivatives is finite dimensional.

Thus we can see an equivalent condition that a generating function is holonomic if its coefficients satisfy a -recurrence of the form

In other words, the properties that a sequence be -recursive and have a holonomic generating function are equivalent. Holonomic functions are closed under the Hadamard product operation  on generating functions.

Examples

and the non-convergent

are all holonomic.

Software for working with -recursive sequences and holonomic generating functions

Tools for processing and working with -recursive sequences in Mathematica include the software packages provided for non-commercial use on the RISC Combinatorics Group algorithmic combinatorics software site. Despite being mostly closed-source, particularly powerful tools in this software suite are provided by the Guess package for guessing -recurrences for arbitrary input sequences (useful for experimental mathematics and exploration) and the Sigma package which is able to find P-recurrences for many sums and solve for closed-form solutions to -recurrences involving generalized harmonic numbers. Other packages listed on this particular RISC site are targeted at working with holonomic generating functions specifically.

Relation to discrete-time Fourier transform 

When the series converges absolutely,

is the discrete-time Fourier transform of the sequence .

Asymptotic growth of a sequence 
In calculus, often the growth rate of the coefficients of a power series can be used to deduce a radius of convergence for the power series. The reverse can also hold; often the radius of convergence for a generating function can be used to deduce the asymptotic growth of the underlying sequence.

For instance, if an ordinary generating function  that has a finite radius of convergence of  can be written as

using the Gamma function, a binomial coefficient, or a multiset coefficient.

In particular,

Similar asymptotic analysis is possible for exponential generating functions; with an exponential generating function, it is  that grows according to these asymptotic formulae. Generally, if the generating function of one sequence minus the generating function of a second sequence has a radius of convergence that is larger than the radius of convergence of the individual generating functions then the two sequences have the same asymptotic growth.

Asymptotic growth of the sequence of squares 
As derived above, the ordinary generating function for the sequence of squares is

Asymptotic growth of the Catalan numbers 

The ordinary generating function for the Catalan numbers is

Bivariate and multivariate generating functions 
One can define generating functions in several variables for arrays with several indices. These are called multivariate generating functions or, sometimes, super generating functions. For two variables, these are often called bivariate generating functions.

the generating function for the binomial coefficients is:

Representation by continued fractions (Jacobi-type -fractions)

Definitions 

Expansions of (formal) Jacobi-type and Stieltjes-type continued fractions (-fractions and -fractions, respectively) whose th rational convergents represent -order accurate power series are another way to express the typically divergent ordinary generating functions for many special one and two-variate sequences.

Properties of the th convergent functions 

For  (though in practice when ), we can define the rational th convergents to the infinite -fraction, expanded by

Examples 

The next table provides examples of closed-form formulas for the component sequences found computationally (and subsequently proved correct in the cited references)
in several special cases of the prescribed sequences, generated by the general expansions of the -fractions defined in the first subsection.

{| class="wikitable"
|-
!  !!  !!  !! 
|-
|  ||  ||  || 
|-
|  ||  ||  || 
|-
|  ||  ||  || 
|-
|  ||  ||  || 
|-
|  ||  ||  || 
|-
|  ||  || 
||
|-
|  ||  || 
||
|}

The radii of convergence of these series corresponding to the definition of the Jacobi-type -fractions given above are in general different from that of the corresponding power series expansions defining the ordinary generating functions of these sequences.

Examples

Generating functions for the sequence of square numbers  are:

Ordinary generating function

Exponential generating function

Lambert series

As an example of a Lambert series identity not given in the main article, we can show that for  we have that 

where we have the special case identity for the generating function of the divisor function, given by

Bell series

Dirichlet series generating function

using the Riemann zeta function.

The sequence  generated by a Dirichlet series generating function (DGF) corresponding to:

where  is the Riemann zeta function, has the ordinary generating function:

Multivariate generating functions
Multivariate generating functions arise in practice when calculating the number of contingency tables of non-negative integers with specified row and column totals. Then, according to I. J. Good, the number of such tables is the coefficient of

in

In the bivariate case, non-polynomial double sum examples of so-termed "double" or "super" generating functions of the form

include the following two-variable generating functions for the binomial coefficients, the Stirling numbers, and the Eulerian numbers:

Applications

Various techniques: Evaluating sums and tackling other problems with generating functions

Example 1: A formula for sums of harmonic numbers

Generating functions give us several methods to manipulate sums and to establish identities between sums.

The simplest case occurs when . We then know that  for the corresponding ordinary generating functions.

For example, we can manipulate

where  are the harmonic numbers. Let

be the ordinary generating function of the harmonic numbers. Then

and thus

Using

convolution with the numerator yields

which can also be written as

Example 2: Modified binomial coefficient sums and the binomial transform

As another example of using generating functions to relate sequences and manipulate sums, for an arbitrary sequence  we define the two sequences of sums

for all , and seek to express the second sums in terms of the first. We suggest an approach by generating functions.

First, we use the binomial transform to write the generating function for the first sum as

Since the generating function for the sequence  is given by

we may write the generating function for the second sum defined above in the form

In particular, we may write this modified sum generating function in the form of

Finally, it follows that we may express the second sums through the first sums in the following form:

Example 3: Generating functions for mutually recursive sequences

In this example, we reformulate a generating function example given in Section 7.3 of Concrete Mathematics (see also Section 7.1 of the same reference for pretty pictures of generating function series). In particular, suppose that we seek the total number of ways (denoted ) to tile a 3-by- rectangle with unmarked 2-by-1 domino pieces. Let the auxiliary sequence, be defined as the number of ways to cover a 3-by- rectangle-minus-corner section of the full rectangle. We seek to use these definitions to give a closed form formula for  without breaking down this definition further to handle the cases of vertical versus horizontal dominoes. Notice that the ordinary generating functions for our two sequences correspond to the series

Since we have that for all integers , the index-shifted generating functions satisfy

we can use the initial conditions specified above and the previous two recurrence relations to see that we have the next two equations relating the generating functions for these sequences given by

which then implies by solving the system of equations (and this is the particular trick to our method here) that

Thus by performing algebraic simplifications to the sequence resulting from the second partial fractions expansions of the generating function in the previous equation, we find that  and that

for all integers . We also note that the same shifted generating function technique applied to the second-order recurrence for the Fibonacci numbers is the prototypical example of using generating functions to solve recurrence relations in one variable already covered, or at least hinted at, in the subsection on rational functions given above.

Convolution (Cauchy products)

A discrete convolution of the terms in two formal power series turns a product of generating functions into a generating function enumerating a convolved sum of the original sequence terms (see Cauchy product).

Consider the triply convolved sequence resulting from the product of three ordinary generating functions 
Consider the -fold convolution of a sequence with itself for some positive integer  (see the example below for an application) 

Multiplication of generating functions, or convolution of their underlying sequences, can correspond to a notion of independent events in certain counting and probability scenarios.

Similarly, the number of ways to pay  cents in coin denominations of values in the set {1, 5, 10, 25, 50} (i.e., in pennies, nickels, dimes, quarters, and half dollars, respectively) is generated by the product

and moreover, if we allow the  cents to be paid in coins of any positive integer denomination, we arrive at the generating for the number of such combinations of change being generated by the partition function generating function expanded by the infinite -Pochhammer symbol product of

Example: The generating function for the Catalan numbers

An example where convolutions of generating functions are useful allows us to solve for a specific closed-form function representing the ordinary generating function for the Catalan numbers, . In particular, this sequence has the combinatorial interpretation as being the number of ways to insert parentheses into the product  so that the order of multiplication is completely specified. It follows that the sequence satisfies a recurrence relation given by

and so has a corresponding convolved generating function, satisfying

Since , we then arrive at a formula for this generating function given by

which then leads to another "simple" (of form) continued fraction expansion of this generating function.

Example: Spanning trees of fans and convolutions of convolutions

A fan of order  is defined to be a graph on the vertices  with  edges connected according to the following rules: Vertex 0 is connected by a single edge to each of the other  vertices, and vertex  is connected by a single edge to the next vertex  for all . There is one fan of order one, three fans of order two, eight fans of order three, and so on. A spanning tree is a subgraph of a graph which contains all of the original vertices and which contains enough edges to make this subgraph connected, but not so many edges that there is a cycle in the subgraph. We ask how many spanning trees  of a fan of order  are possible for each .

As an observation, we may approach the question by counting the number of ways to join adjacent sets of vertices. More generally, we may write a formula for this sequence as

from which we see that the ordinary generating function for this sequence is given by the next sum of convolutions as

from which we are able to extract an exact formula for the sequence by taking the partial fraction expansion of the last generating function.

Implicit generating functions and the Lagrange inversion formula

Introducing a free parameter (snake oil method)
Sometimes the sum  is complicated, and it is not always easy to evaluate. The "Free Parameter" method is another method (called "snake oil" by H. Wilf) to evaluate these sums.

Both methods discussed so far have  as limit in the summation.

For example, if we want to compute

we can treat  as a "free" parameter, and set

Interchanging summation (“snake oil”) gives

Thus

Then we obtain

We thus set

Interchanging summation ("snake oil") gives

Thus

Thus we obtain

Generating functions prove congruences
We say that two generating functions (power series) are congruent modulo , written  if their coefficients are congruent modulo  for all , i.e.,  for all relevant cases of the integers  (note that we need not assume that  is an integer here—it may very well be polynomial-valued in some indeterminate , for example). For example, we can prove that the Euler numbers,

satisfy the following congruence modulo 3:

One of the most useful, if not downright powerful, methods of obtaining congruences for sequences enumerated by special generating functions modulo any integers (i.e., not only prime powers ) is given in the section on continued fraction representations of (even non-convergent) ordinary generating functions by -fractions above. We cite one particular result related to generating series expanded through a representation by continued fraction from Lando's Lectures on Generating Functions as follows:

Generating functions also have other uses in proving congruences for their coefficients. We cite the next two specific examples deriving special case congruences for the Stirling numbers of the first kind and for the partition function  which show the versatility of generating functions in tackling problems involving integer sequences.

The Stirling numbers modulo small integers

The main article on the Stirling numbers generated by the finite products

provides an overview of the congruences for these numbers derived strictly from properties of their generating function as in Section 4.6 of Wilf's stock reference Generatingfunctionology.
We repeat the basic argument and notice that when reduces modulo 2, these finite product generating functions each satisfy

which implies that the parity of these Stirling numbers matches that of the binomial coefficient

and consequently shows that  is even whenever .

Similarly, we can reduce the right-hand-side products defining the Stirling number generating functions modulo 3 to obtain slightly more complicated expressions providing that

Congruences for the partition function

In this example, we pull in some of the machinery of infinite products whose power series expansions generate the expansions of many special functions and enumerate partition functions. In particular, we recall that the partition function  is generated by the reciprocal infinite -Pochhammer symbol product (or -Pochhammer product as the case may be) given by

This partition function satisfies many known congruence properties, which notably include the following results though there are still many open questions about the forms of related integer congruences for the function:

We show how to use generating functions and manipulations of congruences for formal power series to give a highly elementary proof of the first of these congruences listed above.

First, we observe that in the binomial coefficient generating function

all of the coefficients are divisible by 5 except for those which correspond to the powers  and moreover in those cases the remainder of the coefficient is 1 modulo 5.  Thus, 
 
or equivalently

It follows that

Using the infinite product expansions of 

Finally, since

Transformations of generating functions
There are a number of transformations of generating functions that provide other applications (see the main article). A transformation of a sequence's ordinary generating function (OGF) provides a method of converting the generating function for one sequence into a generating function enumerating another. These transformations typically involve integral formulas involving a sequence OGF (see integral transformations) or weighted sums over the higher-order derivatives of these functions (see derivative transformations).

Generating function transformations can come into play when we seek to express a generating function for the sums

in the form of  involving the original sequence generating function. For example, if the sums are

then the generating function for the modified sum expressions is given by

(see also the binomial transform and the Stirling transform).

There are also integral formulas for converting between a sequence's OGF, and its exponential generating function, or EGF, and vice versa given by

Other applications
Generating functions are used to:

 Find a closed formula for a sequence given in a recurrence relation. For example, consider Fibonacci numbers.
 Find recurrence relations for sequences—the form of a generating function may suggest a recurrence formula.
 Find relationships between sequences—if the generating functions of two sequences have a similar form, then the sequences themselves may be related.
 Explore the asymptotic behaviour of sequences.
 Prove identities involving sequences.
 Solve enumeration problems in combinatorics and encoding their solutions. Rook polynomials are an example of an application in combinatorics.
 Evaluate infinite sums.

Other generating functions

Examples

Examples of polynomial sequences generated by more complex generating functions include:

 Appell polynomials
 Chebyshev polynomials
 Difference polynomials
 Generalized Appell polynomials
 -difference polynomials

Other sequences generated by more complex generating functions:

 Double exponential generating functions. For example: Aitken's Array: Triangle of Numbers
 Hadamard products of generating functions and diagonal generating functions, and their corresponding integral transformations

Convolution polynomials

Knuth's article titled "Convolution Polynomials" defines a generalized class of convolution polynomial sequences by their special generating functions of the form

for some analytic function  with a power series expansion such that .

We say that a family of polynomials, forms a convolution family if  and if the following convolution condition holds for all ,  and for all :

We see that for non-identically zero convolution families, this definition is equivalent to requiring that the sequence have an ordinary generating function of the first form given above.

A sequence of convolution polynomials defined in the notation above has the following properties:

 The sequence  is of binomial type
 For arbitrary (fixed) , these polynomials satisfy convolution formulas of the form

For a fixed non-zero parameter , we have modified generating functions for these convolution polynomial sequences given by

where  is implicitly defined by a functional equation of the form .

Examples of convolution polynomial sequences include the binomial power series, so-termed tree polynomials, the Bell numbers, the Laguerre polynomials, and the Stirling convolution polynomials.

Tables of special generating functions

An initial listing of special mathematical series is found here. A number of useful and special sequence generating functions are found in Section 5.4 and 7.4 of Concrete Mathematics and in Section 2.5 of Wilf's Generatingfunctionology. Other special generating functions of note include the entries in the next table, which is by no means complete.

{| class="wikitable"
|-
! Formal power series !! Generating-function formula !! Notes
|-
|  ||  ||  is a first-order harmonic number
|-
|  ||  ||  is a Bernoulli number
|-
|  ||  ||  is a Fibonacci number and 
|-
|  ||  ||  denotes the rising factorial, or Pochhammer symbol and some integer 
|-
|  || 
|-
|  || 
|-
|  || 
|-
|-
|  ||  ||  is a Stirling number of the second kind and where the individual terms in the expansion satisfy 
|-
|  ||  ||
|-
|  ||  || The two-variable case is given by 
|-
|  ||  || 
|-
|  ||  || 
|-
|||||
|}

History 
George Pólya writes in Mathematics and plausible reasoning:
The name "generating function" is due to Laplace. Yet, without giving it a name, Euler used the device of generating functions long before Laplace [..]. He applied this mathematical tool to several problems in Combinatory Analysis and the Theory of Numbers.

See also
 Moment-generating function
 Probability-generating function
 Generating function transformation
 Stanley's reciprocity theorem
 Applications to Partition (number theory)
 Combinatorial principles
 Cyclic sieving
 Z-transform
 Umbral calculus

Notes

References

Citations

  Reprinted in

External links
 "Introduction To Ordinary Generating Functions" by Mike Zabrocki, York University, Mathematics and Statistics
 
 Generating Functions, Power Indices and Coin Change at cut-the-knot
 "Generating Functions" by Ed Pegg Jr., Wolfram Demonstrations Project, 2007.